Wuhan Metro owns and uses the following types of rolling stock. The system track gauge is 1 435 mm standard gauge.

Type and size
Wuhan Metro trains come in two sizes, Type-B cars and larger Type-A cars, both of which are commonly used by other rapid transit system in China. The size of Type-A car is larger than that of Type-B car. Type-A car has 5 pairs of doors per car, while Type-B car has 4 pairs of doors per car.

Train statistics
All the trains of Wuhan Metro were manufactured by CRRC Changchun Railway Vehicles and CRRC Zhuzhou Locomotive, both of which have factories in Wuhan.

Gallery

References 

Wuhan Metro
Lists of rolling stock
1500 V DC multiple units
750 V DC multiple units
Electric multiple units of China